The 1979–80 Boston Celtics season was the 34th season of the Boston Celtics in the National Basketball Association (NBA). Bolstered by the play of 23-year-old rookie Larry Bird, the Celtics improved from 29-53 the previous year, to 61-21, at the time the best NBA single season turnaround ever, and would cruise to the Eastern Conference Finals but lose to the Philadelphia 76ers 4-1.

Draft picks

 Forward Larry Bird was selected in the previous year's draft, then played his senior season at Indiana State

Roster

Regular season

Season standings

Record vs. opponents

Game log

Regular season

|- align="center" bgcolor="#ccffcc"
| 1
| October 12
| Houston
| W 114–106
|
|
|
| Boston Garden
| 1–0
|- align="center" bgcolor="#ccffcc"
| 2
| October 13
| @ Cleveland
| W 139–117
|
|
|
| Richfield Coliseum
| 2–0
|- align="center" bgcolor="#ccffcc"
| 3
| October 17
| Cleveland
| W 127–108
|
|
|
| Boston Garden
| 3–0
|- align="center" bgcolor="#ccffcc"
| 4
| October 19
| Washington
| W 130–93
|
|
|
| Boston Garden
| 4–0
|- align="center" bgcolor="#ffcccc"
| 5
| October 20
| @ Indiana
| L 128–131 (OT)
|
|
|
| Market Square Arena
| 4–1
|- align="center" bgcolor="#ffcccc"
| 6
| October 23
| @ San Antonio
| L 120–129
|
|
|
| HemisFair Arena
| 4–2
|- align="center" bgcolor="#ccffcc"
| 7
| October 24
| @ Houston
| W 100–99
|
|
|
| The Summit
| 5–2
|- align="center" bgcolor="#ccffcc"
| 8
| October 27
| @ Atlanta
| W 100–95
|
|
|
| The Omni
| 6–2
|- align="center" bgcolor="#ccffcc"
| 9
| October 31
| @ New Jersey
| W 116–79
|
|
|
| Rutgers Athletic Center
| 7–2

|- align="center" bgcolor="#ccffcc"
| 10
| November 3
| @ Washington
| W 118–97
|
|
|
| Capital Centre
| 8–2
|- align="center" bgcolor="#ccffcc"
| 11
| November 7
| San Antonio
| W 117–105
|
|
|
| Boston Garden
| 9–2
|- align="center" bgcolor="#ccffcc"
| 12
| November 9
| Kansas City
| W 127–119
|
|
|
| Boston Garden
| 10–2
|- align="center" bgcolor="#ffcccc"
| 13
| November 10
| @ Philadelphia
| L 94–95
|
|
|
| The Spectrum
| 10–3
|- align="center" bgcolor="#ccffcc"
| 14
| November 14
| Detroit
| W 115–111
|
|
|
| Boston Garden
| 11–3
|- align="center" bgcolor="#ccffcc"
| 15
| November 16
| Utah
| W 113–97
|
|
|
| Boston Garden
| 12–3
|- align="center" bgcolor="#ffcccc"
| 16
| November 17
| @ New York
| L 109–113
|
|
|
| Madison Square Garden
| 12–4
|- align="center" bgcolor="#ccffcc"
| 17
| November 21
| New Jersey
| W 111–103
|
|
|
| Boston Garden
| 13–4
|- align="center" bgcolor="#ccffcc"
| 18
| November 23
| Indiana
| W 118–103
|
|
|
| Boston Garden
| 14–4
|- align="center" bgcolor="#ccffcc"
| 19
| November 24
| @ Atlanta
| W 106–101
|
|
|
| The Omni
| 15–4
|- align="center" bgcolor="#ccffcc"
| 20
| November 28
| Denver
| W 119–97
|
|
|
| Boston Garden
| 16–4
|- align="center" bgcolor="#ccffcc"
| 21
| November 30
| New York
| W 100–97
|
|
|
| Boston Garden
| 17–4

|- align="center" bgcolor="#ccffcc"
| 22
| December 1
| @ Indiana
| W 106–102 (OT)
|
|
|
| Market Square Arena
| 18–4
|- align="center" bgcolor="#ffcccc"
| 23
| December 2
| @ Kansas City
| L 88–94
|
|
|
| Municipal Auditorium
| 18–5
|- align="center" bgcolor="#ccffcc"
| 24
| December 4
| @ Detroit
| W 118–114 (OT)
|
|
|
| Pontiac Silverdome
| 19–5
|- align="center" bgcolor="#ffcccc"
| 25
| December 5
| Atlanta
| L 92–120
|
|
|
| Boston Garden
| 19–6
|- align="center" bgcolor="#ccffcc"
| 26
| December 7
| Phoenix
| W 100–92
|
|
|
| Boston Garden
| 20–6
|- align="center" bgcolor="#ffcccc"
| 27
| December 8
| @ Cleveland
| L 100–116
|
|
|
| Richfield Coliseum
| 20–7
|- align="center" bgcolor="#ccffcc"
| 28
| December 9
| @ Milwaukee
| W 113–108
|
|
|
| MECCA Arena
| 21–7
|- align="center" bgcolor="#ccffcc"
| 29
| December 12
| New Jersey
| W 116–102
|
|
|
| Boston Garden
| 22–7
|- align="center" bgcolor="#ccffcc"
| 30
| December 14
| Milwaukee
| W 97–94
|
|
|
| Boston Garden
| 23–7
|- align="center" bgcolor="#ccffcc"
| 31
| December 15
| @ New York
| W 99–96
|
|
|
| Madison Square Garden
| 24–7
|- align="center" bgcolor="#ccffcc"
| 32
| December 16
| @ New Jersey
| W 115–112 (OT)
|
|
|
| Rutgers Athletic Center
| 25–7
|- align="center" bgcolor="#ccffcc"
| 33
| December 19
| Philadelphia
| W 112–89
|
|
|
| Boston Garden
| 26–7
|- align="center" bgcolor="#ccffcc"
| 34
| December 21
| San Antonio
| W 133–114
|
|
|
| Boston Garden
| 27–7
|- align="center" bgcolor="#ffcccc"
| 35
| December 22
| @ Philadelphia
| L 113–126
|
|
|
| The Spectrum
| 27–8
|- align="center" bgcolor="#ccffcc"
| 36
| December 27
| @ San Diego
| W 118–97
|
|
|
| San Diego Sports Arena
| 28–8
|- align="center" bgcolor="#ffcccc"
| 37
| December 28
| @ Los Angeles
| L 105–123
|
|
|
| The Forum
| 28–9
|- align="center" bgcolor="#ccffcc"
| 38
| December 29
| @ Golden State
| W 104–88
|
|
|
| Oakland–Alameda County Coliseum Arena
| 29–9

|- align="center" bgcolor="#ccffcc"
| 39
| January 2
| @ Houston
| W 111–103
|
|
|
| The Summit
| 30–9
|- align="center" bgcolor="#ffcccc"
| 40
| January 5
| @ San Antonio
| L 111–119
|
|
|
| HemisFair Arena
| 30–10
|- align="center" bgcolor="#ccffcc"
| 41
| January 9
| New York
| W 112–95
|
|
|
| Boston Garden
| 31–10
|- align="center" bgcolor="#ccffcc"
| 42
| January 11
| Atlanta
| W 108–93
|
|
|
| Boston Garden
| 32–10
|- align="center" bgcolor="#ffcccc"
| 43
| January 13
| Los Angeles
| L 98–100
|
|
|
| Boston Garden
| 32–11
|- align="center" bgcolor="#ccffcc"
| 44
| January 16
| Chicago
| W 114–104
|
|
|
| Boston Garden
| 33–11
|- align="center" bgcolor="#ccffcc"
| 45
| January 18
| Portland
| W 111–93
|
|
|
| Boston Garden
| 34–11
|- align="center" bgcolor="#ffcccc"
| 46
| January 20
| Seattle
| L 106–108 (2OT)
|
|
|
| Boston Garden
| 34–12
|- align="center" bgcolor="#ccffcc"
| 47
| January 22
| Houston
| W 112–106
|
|
|
| Boston Garden
| 35–12
|- align="center" bgcolor="#ccffcc"
| 48
| January 23
| @ Detroit
| W 131–104
|
|
|
| Pontiac Silverdome
| 36–12
|- align="center" bgcolor="#ffcccc"
| 49
| January 25
| Washington
| L 107–118
|
|
|
| Boston Garden
| 36–13
|- align="center" bgcolor="#ccffcc"
| 50
| January 27
| San Diego
| W 131–108
|
|
|
| Boston Garden
| 37–13
|- align="center" bgcolor="#ccffcc"
| 51
| January 29
| @ Chicago
| W 103–99
|
|
|
| Chicago Stadium
| 38–13
|- align="center" bgcolor="#ccffcc"
| 52
| January 30
| Cleveland
| W 110–103
|
|
|
| Boston Garden
| 39–13
|- align="center" bgcolor="#ccffcc"
| 53
| January 31
| @ Washington
| W 119–103
|
|
|
| Capital Centre
| 40–13

|- align="center" bgcolor="#ccffcc"
| 54
| February 6
| Philadelphia
| W 129–110
|
|
|
| Boston Garden
| 41–13
|- align="center" bgcolor="#ccffcc"
| 55
| February 8
| Indiana
| W 130–108
|
|
|
| Boston Garden
| 42–13
|- align="center" bgcolor="#ccffcc"
| 56
| February 10
| Detroit
| W 128–111
|
|
|
| Boston Garden
| 43–13
|- align="center" bgcolor="#ffcccc"
| 57
| February 13
| @ Phoenix
| L 134–135
|
|
|
| Arizona Veterans Memorial Coliseum
| 43–14
|- align="center" bgcolor="#ccffcc"
| 58
| February 15
| @ Portland
| W 106–91
|
|
|
| Memorial Coliseum
| 44–14
|- align="center" bgcolor="#ffcccc"
| 59
| February 17
| @ Seattle
| L 108–109
|
|
|
| Kingdome
| 44–15
|- align="center" bgcolor="#ccffcc"
| 60
| February 20
| @ Utah
| W 105–98
|
|
|
| Salt Palace
| 45–15
|- align="center" bgcolor="#ccffcc"
| 61
| February 23
| @ Denver
| W 124–105
|
|
|
| McNichols Sports Arena
| 46–15
|- align="center" bgcolor="#ccffcc"
| 62
| February 26
| Atlanta
| W 108–97
|
|
|
| Hartford Civic Center
| 47–15
|- align="center" bgcolor="#ccffcc"
| 63
| February 27
| San Antonio
| W 130–125
|
|
|
| Boston Garden
| 48–15
|- align="center" bgcolor="#ccffcc"
| 64
| February 29
| Golden State
| W 110–99
|
|
|
| Boston Garden
| 49–15

|- align="center" bgcolor="#ccffcc"
| 65
| March 2
| Detroit
| W 118–115
|
|
|
| Boston Garden
| 50–15
|- align="center" bgcolor="#ccffcc"
| 66
| March 4
| @ San Antonio
| W 137–108
|
|
|
| HemisFair Arena
| 51–15
|- align="center" bgcolor="#ccffcc"
| 67
| March 5
| @ Houston
| W 103–99 (OT)
|
|
|
| The Summit
| 52–15
|- align="center" bgcolor="#ccffcc"
| 68
| March 7
| Philadelphia
| W 111–92
|
|
|
| Boston Garden
| 53–15
|- align="center" bgcolor="#ffcccc"
| 69
| March 9
| Washington
| L 128–133 (OT)
|
|
|
| Boston Garden
| 53–16
|- align="center" bgcolor="#ffcccc"
| 70
| March 11
| @ Indiana
| L 108–114
|
|
|
| Market Square Arena
| 53–17
|- align="center" bgcolor="#ccffcc"
| 71
| March 12
| Houston
| W 121–105
|
|
|
| Boston Garden
| 54–17
|- align="center" bgcolor="#ffcccc"
| 72
| March 14
| @ Atlanta
| L 87–88
|
|
|
| The Omni
| 54–18
|- align="center" bgcolor="#ccffcc"
| 73
| March 15
| @ New York
| W 123–120
|
|
|
| Madison Square Garden
| 55–18
|- align="center" bgcolor="#ccffcc"
| 74
| March 17
| @ New Jersey
| W 117–92
|
|
|
| Rutgers Athletic Center
| 56–18
|- align="center" bgcolor="#ccffcc"
| 75
| March 18
| Indiana
| W 114–102
|
|
|
| Hartford Civic Center
| 57–18
|- align="center" bgcolor="#ccffcc"
| 76
| March 20
| @ Detroit
| W 124–106
|
|
|
| Pontiac Silverdome
| 58–18
|- align="center" bgcolor="#ffcccc"
| 77
| March 22
| @ Cleveland
| L 105–109
|
|
|
| Richfield Coliseum
| 58–19
|- align="center" bgcolor="#ffcccc"
| 78
| March 23
| New Jersey
| L 96–101
|
|
|
| Boston Garden
| 58–20
|- align="center" bgcolor="#ccffcc"
| 79
| March 25
| @ Washington
| W 96–95
|
|
|
| Capital Centre
| 59–20
|- align="center" bgcolor="#ccffcc"
| 80
| March 26
| New York
| W 129–121
|
|
|
| Boston Garden
| 60–20
|- align="center" bgcolor="#ccffcc"
| 81
| March 28
| Cleveland
| W 130–122
|
|
|
| Boston Garden
| 61–20
|- align="center" bgcolor="#ffcccc"
| 82
| March 30
| @ Philadelphia
| L 110–116
|
|
|
| The Spectrum
| 61–21

Playoffs

|- align="center" bgcolor="#ccffcc"
| 1
| April 9
| Houston
| W 119–101
| Chris Ford (19)
| Cedric Maxwell (12)
| Tiny Archibald (9)
| Boston Garden15,320
| 1–0
|- align="center" bgcolor="#ccffcc"
| 2
| April 11
| Houston
| W 95–75
| Larry Bird (14)
| Cedric Maxwell (10)
| Tiny Archibald (7)
| Boston Garden15,320
| 2–0
|- align="center" bgcolor="#ccffcc"
| 3
| April 13
| @ Houston
| W 100–81
| Tiny Archibald (20)
| Cedric Maxwell (12)
| Tiny Archibald (10)
| The Summit14,243
| 3–0
|- align="center" bgcolor="#ccffcc"
| 4
| April 14
| @ Houston
| W 138–121
| Larry Bird (34)
| Larry Bird (10)
| Tiny Archibald (10)
| The Summit13,106
| 4–0
|-

|- align="center" bgcolor="#ffcccc"
| 1
| April 18
| Philadelphia
| L 93–96
| Larry Bird (27)
| Dave Cowens (10)
| Tiny Archibald (7)
| Boston Garden15,320
| 0–1
|- align="center" bgcolor="#ccffcc"
| 2
| April 20
| Philadelphia
| W 96–90
| Larry Bird (31)
| Cedric Maxwell (15)
| Tiny Archibald (8)
| Boston Garden15,320
| 1–1
|- align="center" bgcolor="#ffcccc"
| 3
| April 23
| @ Philadelphia
| L 97–99
| Larry Bird (22)
| Larry Bird (21)
| Tiny Archibald (7)
| Spectrum18,276
| 1–2
|- align="center" bgcolor="#ffcccc"
| 4
| April 25
| @ Philadelphia
| L 90–102
| Larry Bird (19)
| Larry Bird (13)
| Gerald Henderson (6)
| Spectrum18,276
| 1–3
|- align="center" bgcolor="#ffcccc"
| 5
| April 27
| Philadelphia
| L 94–105
| Archibald, Cowens (22)
| Larry Bird (14)
| Tiny Archibald (9)
| Boston Garden15,320
| 1–4
|-

References

See also
 1979–80 NBA season

Boston Celtics seasons
Boston Celtics
Boston Celtics
Boston Celtics
Celtics
Celtics